Bardwell Mill is a Grade II* listed tower mill at Bardwell, Suffolk, England which is under restoration.

History
Bardwell Mill was built in 1823. It worked by wind until 1925 and then by a Blackstone oil engine until 1941. The mill was derelict in 1978 but was later purchased by James Waterfield, who completed the restoration of the mill in 1985. The mill was sold to Geoffrey and Enid Wheeler in July 1987. On 16 October 1987, the mill was tailwinded when one of the gears in the fantail drive system became disengaged. The result was that the windshaft sheared at the rear of the canister, bringing the sails crashing to the ground. Restoration work began again in 1989 but was hampered by limited funds. Geoffrey Wheeler died in 1995 and in 1997 The Friends of Bardwell Windmill was set up. English Heritage and St Edmundsbury Borough Council gave over £73,000 towards the estimated cost of £92,000 to restore the mill. The balance was to be raised by the Friends. A replacement cap, cast iron windshaft and fantail were fitted to the mill in 2004.

Owing to rising costs, it was decided that the new sails would be constructed by volunteer labour. The first pair of sails were completed by late summer 2008 and fitted in late 2010. The second pair of sails were fitted in April 2012.

Description

Bardwell Mill is a four-storey tower mill. The beehive cap is winded by a fantail. The brake wheel is wood, driving a cast-iron wallower carried on a wooden upright shaft. The wooden great spur wheel drives two pairs of overdrift millstones. A wooden crownwheel on the upright shaft drives a sack hoist.

Millers
Geoffrey Wheeler 1987–95
James Waterfield 1985–87
Simon Wooster 1987
References for above:-

Public access
The mill is open to the public "at any reasonable time".

References

External links
Bardwell Windmill - Suffolk Mills Group
Bardwell Windmill - Mills Open to Visitors
Windmill World webpage on Bardwell Mill.

Windmills in Suffolk
Tower mills in the United Kingdom
Windmills completed in 1823
Grinding mills in the United Kingdom
Grade II* listed buildings in Suffolk
Grade II* listed windmills
Bardwell, Suffolk
Museums in Suffolk
Mill museums in England
Towers completed in 1823